The Piccadilly Gallery was an art gallery that operated from a number of addresses in London between 1953 and 2007.

It was originally founded as the Pilkington Gallery in 1953 by Eve Pilkington and her husband Godfrey Pilkington, with a focus on exhibiting the works of figurative artists in the styles of Art Nouveau and 19th and 20th Century Symbolism. In 1954, they were joined by Christabel Briggs.  In 2007, following the passing of co-founder Godfrey Pilkington, the gallery closed its public storefront. 

The gallery operated from a number of West End addresses, first from bomb-damaged premises in the Piccadilly Arcade, and then on to 16A Cork Street in 1954. In 1978, it moved next door to 16 Cork Street, and in 1999 the gallery temporarily moved to Dover Street.

It promoted the artists Adrian Berg as well as Max Beerbohm, Gwen John, Eric Gill and William Roberts, and hosted major exhibitions, including Gustav Klimt, Egon Schiele, and the German Neue Sachlichkeit.

Listings of the gallery's exhibitions and correspondences are held by the Tate.

References

Citation

Defunct art galleries in London
Art museums established in 1953
1953 establishments in England